The Kuokuang Power Plant is a gas-fired power plant in Guishan District, Taoyuan City, Taiwan. At a total capacity of 480 MW, it is currently Taiwan's smallest gas-fired power plant.

Kuo Kuang Power Corporation
Kuo Kuang Power Corporation is a company owned by China National Petroleum Corporation [CPC] (45%), CTCI Taiwan (20%) and Meiya Power Company (35%).

See also

 List of power stations in Taiwan
 Electricity sector in Taiwan

References 

Taipei Times: "CPC to use state-owned land for new power plant" 2nd Dec 2000

2003 establishments in Taiwan
Buildings and structures in Taoyuan City
Energy infrastructure completed in 2003
Natural gas-fired power stations in Taiwan